Llansteffan, is a village and a community situated on the south coast of Carmarthenshire, Wales, lying on the estuary of the River Tywi,  south of Carmarthen.

Description
The community includes  Llanybri and is bordered by the communities of: Laugharne Township; Llangynog; Llangain; St Ishmael; and Pembrey and Burry Port Town. The population of the community was 941 in 2011 which includes the Llansteffan village population of 424.

Llansteffan means "Llan of Saint Stephen", but honours a 6th-century Welsh associate of Saint Teilo rather than the more widely known protomartyr.

The parish of Llansteffan consists of two distinct villages with separate churches: Llansteffan by the estuary and Llanybri inland on the hilltop.  St Ystyffan's church is a grade II* listed building. Between the castle and village sits Plas Llanstephan, Lord Kylsant's former residence, which is also a grade II* listed building 

The village was connected to Ferryside, on the opposite bank of the Towy estuary, by a ferry until the 1950s. It saved visitors a 16 mile road trip. In 2018, a ferry service resumed using an amphibious boat to negotiate Llansteffan beach, rather than the 1950s jetty.

Castle

Llansteffan Castle, built by the Normans in the 12th century and granted to the Marmion family, stands above the village on a promontory commanding the estuary passage. Located between the ferry crossing-points of the Tywi and Tâf rivers, Llansteffan was an important staging post on the coastal route from Glamorgan via Kidwelly to Pembroke.

Governance
At the local level, Llansteffan is governed by Llansteffan & Llanybri Community Council comprising up to 10 community councillors.

Until 2022 a county electoral ward of Llansteffan existed. This ward stretched north from Llansteffan to include Llangynog and Llangain, with a total population of 2,006. From the 2022 local elections Llansteffan was merged with the St Clears ward to become 'St Clears and Llansteffan', represented by two county councillors.

Notable people
The poet Dylan Thomas had strong family links to Llansteffan. The triangle formed by Llangynog, Llangain and Llansteffan constitutes as Thomas once put it, his "breeding-box valley". His mother's family, the Williamses, lived within this triangle in farms such as Waunfwlchan, Llwyngwyn, Maesgwyn and Penycoed. His mother's half-sister, Anne, lived in Rose Cottage in the village.
The artist Osi Rhys Osmond, lived in Llansteffan for 30 years until his death.
 Lieutenant Tomos Stephens, an SAS soldier who was taken prisoner during Operation Bulbasket in World War II, then beaten to death by a German officer.

See also 
Llanybri
Maurice FitzGerald, Lord of Lanstephan

References

External links
Community website
Llareggub, Llansteffan and the 1939 War Register

Seaside resorts in Wales
Communities in Carmarthenshire
Villages in Carmarthenshire
Carmarthen Bay
Carmarthenshire electoral wards